The 2016–17 season was the 112th season of competitive football in Turkey.

Pre-season

League tables

Süper Lig

1.Lig

2.Lig

White Group

Red Group

Turkish Cup

Teams seeded for the group stages: Galatasaray (defending champions), Beşiktaş (1st in the Süper Lig), Fenerbahçe (2nd), and Konyaspor (3rd).
Teams seeded for the play-off round: İstanbul Başakşehir (4th in the Süper Lig), Osmanlıspor (5th), Galatasaray (6th), Kasımpaşa (7th), Akhisar Belediyespor (8th), Antalyaspor (9th), Gençlerbirliği (10th), Bursaspor (11th), Trabzonspor (12th), Çaykur Rizespor (13th), Gaziantepspor (14th), Adanaspor (1.Lig champions), Kardemir Karabükspor (1.Lig runners-up), and Alanyaspor (promoted from the 1.Lig)
Teams seeded for the second round: Sivasspor (16th in the Süper Lig), Eskişehirspor (17th), Mersin İdman Yurdu (18th), Adana Demirspor (4th in the 1.Lig), Elazığspor (5th), Balıkesirspor (6th), Giresunspor (7th), Gaziantep B.B. (8th), Samsunspor (9th), Altınordu (10th), Yeni Malatyaspor (11th), Boluspor (12th), Göztepe (13th), Şanlıurfaspor (14th), Denizlispor (15th), 1461 Trabzon (16th in the 1.Lig), Kayseri Erciyesspor (17th), Karşıyaka (18th),

Final

National team

Friendlies

2018 FIFA World Cup qualification

Turkish clubs in Europe

UEFA Champions League

Third qualifying round

Group stage

Group B

UEFA Europa League

Second qualifying round

Third qualifying round

Play-off Round

Group stage

Group A

Group H

Group L

Knockout phase

Round of 32

Round of 16

Quarter-finals

References

 
Seasons in Turkish football
Turkish 2016